Clayton Benjamin Lambert (born 10 February 1962) is a former Guyanese-American cricketer, who later played for United States as well.

Career
Lambert made his debut for Guyana at the Regional Under 19 level in 1979, and captained the Berbice team in 1980.

Lambert first appeared in the West Indies team for a One Day International against England in Georgetown, against whom he also made an unsuccessful Test match debut at The Oval in 1991. Although he played in four ODIs in Sharjah in 1991/92, he did not return to the Test match side until 1997–98, where he made centuries in both the fifth ODI and the sixth Test against England before struggling in the series against South Africa and being dropped from the Test side. According to Statistician Charwayne Walker in 2014, Lambert's 151 against Barbados 1997 at Bourda is still the highest score by a Guyanese batsman at the Regional one day level.

Lambert returned to international cricket aged 42, playing for the United States in the 2004 ICC Champions Trophy.

Lambert also played first-class cricket for Guyana and played for Northern Transvaal in 1993. Lambert now played for Lawrenceville in the Atlanta Georgia Cricket Conference from 2012 to 2014.

He coaches cricket in the US.

See also
 List of cricketers who have played for more than one international team

References

External links
 

1962 births
Living people
United States One Day International cricketers
American cricketers
Dual international cricketers
Guyanese cricketers
Berbice cricketers
Northerns cricketers
West Indies One Day International cricketers
West Indies Test cricketers
Guyana cricketers
Afro-Guyanese people
Guyanese cricket coaches
Coaches of the United States national cricket team
Guyanese emigrants to the United States
American sportspeople of Guyanese descent
Guyanese expatriates in South Africa
American cricket captains
Scarborough Festival President's XI cricketers